San Luis Río Colorado is a municipality in Sonora state, in northwestern Mexico.

The municipality is the location of the city of San Luis Rio Colorado, the community of El Golfo de Santa Clara, and the Bahia Adair biosphere preserve.

Geography
The municipality is in the Lower Colorado River Valley, with the Colorado River along its west,  the U.S.-Mexico border along the north, and to the Colorado River Delta on the southwest, and the Gulf of California (Sea of Cortez) along the south.

Adjacent jurisdictions
 Yuma County, Arizona — north
 Puerto Peñasco Municipality, Sonora — east
 Mexicali Municipality and Colorado River, Baja California  — west
 Gulf of California (Sea of Cortes) — south

Populated places
The largest cities, towns, and villages within the municipality include:

Former settlements
Former historical settlements sites within the current municipality, many along the Colorado River that served shipping by steamboats on the Colorado River, include:

History
The first vaccines against the COVID-19 pandemic in Mexico arrived for medical personal on January 13, 2021.

Eleven people were arrested for possession of weapons reserved for the military on March 13, 2021.

See also
 
 Alto Golfo de California Biosphere Reserve

References

 
Municipalities of Sonora
Communities in the Lower Colorado River Valley
Steamboat transport on the Colorado River